Seán MacBride (26 January 1904 – 15 January 1988) was an Irish Clann na Poblachta politician who served as Minister for External Affairs from 1948 to 1951, Leader of Clann na Poblachta from 1946 to 1965 and Chief of Staff of the IRA from 1936 to 1937. He served as a Teachta Dála (TD) from 1947 to 1957.

Rising from a domestic Irish political career, he founded or participated in many international organisations of the 20th century, including the United Nations, the Council of Europe and Amnesty International. He received the Nobel Peace Prize in 1974, the Lenin Peace Prize for 1975–1976 and the UNESCO Silver Medal for Service in 1980.

Early life
MacBride was born in Paris in 1904, the son of Major John MacBride and Maud Gonne. His first language was French, and he retained a French accent in the English language for the rest of his life. MacBride first studied at the Lycée Saint-Louis-de-Gonzague, and remained in Paris until his father's execution by the British for his involvement in the 1916 Easter Rising, when he was sent to school at Mount St Benedict's, Gorey, County Wexford in Ireland, and briefly at the Downside School. 

MacBride first became involved in politics during the 1918 Irish general election in which he was active for Sinn Féin. The following year in 1919, aged 15, he lied about his age to join the Irish Volunteers, which fought as part of the Irish Republican Army, and took part in the Irish War of Independence. He opposed the 1921 Anglo-Irish Treaty and was imprisoned by the Irish Free State during the Irish Civil War.

On his release in 1924, MacBride studied law at University College Dublin and resumed his IRA activities. He worked briefly for Éamon de Valera as his personal secretary, travelling with him to Rome to meet various dignitaries.

In January 1925, on his twenty-first birthday, MacBride married Catalina "Kid" Bulfin, a woman four years his senior who shared his political views. Bulfin was the daughter of the Irish nationalist publisher and travel-writer William Bulfin.

Before returning to Dublin in 1927, where he became the IRA's Director of Intelligence, MacBride worked as a journalist in Paris and London.

According to historians Tom Mahon and James J. Gillogly, recently deciphered IRA messages from the 1920s reveal that the organisation's two main sources of funding were Clan na Gael and the Soviet Union. The messages further reveal that MacBride, before becoming IRA Director of Intelligence, was involved in the espionage activities in Great Britain of GRU spymaster Walter Krivitsky, whom ciphered IRA communications referred to only by the code name "James".

In addition to supplying the USSR with detailed information on Royal Navy ships and Royal Air Force airplane engines, MacBride provided Soviet agents with "a brief specification and a complete drawing" of ASDIC, an early sonar detection system for enemy submarines during wartime, at a covert meeting in Amsterdam during the autumn of 1926. MacBride also assisted the GRU by providing forged passports to Soviet intelligence operatives who were at risk of capture.

In October 1926, MacBride sent a ciphered report from Paris to his IRA superiors about Soviet counterfeiting operations, saying, "Several bad Bank of England notes have been passed here lately. These are said to emanate from Russia."

Soon after his return to Dublin in 1927, he was arrested and charged with the murder of politician Kevin O'Higgins, who had been assassinated near his home in Booterstown, County Dublin. At his trial, however, Cumann na nGaedheal politician Bryan Cooper testified as a witness for the defence that, at the time of Kevin O'Higgins' murder, both he and MacBride had been aboard a ferry travelling from Britain to Ireland. MacBride was then charged with being a subversive and interned in Mountjoy Prison.

In September 1927, Krivitsky sent the IRA a message from Amsterdam, demanding to see MacBride immediately, claiming to have a "present" he was anxious to give away, and naming a cafe where the meeting could take place. As MacBride was then imprisoned in Dublin, the IRA's chief of staff, Moss Twomey, replied that the request was "rather awkward and impossible to fulfill at the present". In response, Twomey and two other senior IRA members travelled to Amsterdam and met with Krivitsky instead.

Towards the end of the 1920s, after many supporters had left to join Fianna Fáil, some members of the IRA started pushing for a more left-wing agenda. After the IRA Army Council voted down the idea, MacBride launched a new movement, Saor Éire ("Free Ireland"), in 1931. Although it was a non-military organisation, Saor Éire was declared unlawful along with the IRA, Cumann na mBan and nine other bodies. MacBride, meanwhile, became the security services' number-one target.

In 1936, the IRA's chief of staff Moss Twomey was sent to prison for three years; he was replaced by MacBride. At the time, the movement was in a state of disarray, with conflicts between several factions and personalities. Tom Barry was appointed chief of staff to head up a military operation against the British, an action with which MacBride did not agree.

In 1937, MacBride was called to the bar. He then resigned from the IRA when the Constitution of Ireland was enacted later that year. As a barrister, MacBride frequently defended IRA prisoners of the state (Thomas Hart & Patrick McGrath). MacBride was unsuccessful in preventing the 1944 death by hanging of Charlie Kerins, who had been convicted based on fingerprint evidence of the 1942 ambush and murder of Garda Detective Sergeant Denis O'Brien. In 1946, during the inquest into the death of Seán McCaughey, MacBride embarrassed the Irish State by forcing them to admit that conditions in Portlaoise Prison were inhumane.

Clann na Poblachta

In 1946, MacBride founded the republican/socialist party Clann na Poblachta. He hoped it would replace Fianna Fáil as Ireland's major political party. In October 1947, he won a seat in Dáil Éireann at a by-election in the Dublin County constituency. On the same day, Patrick Kinane also won the Tipperary by-election for Clann na Poblachta.

However, at the 1948 general election Clann na Poblachta won only ten seats. The party joined with Fine Gael, the Labour Party, the National Labour Party, Clann na Talmhan and several independents to form the First Inter-Party Government with Fine Gael TD John A. Costello as Taoiseach. Richard Mulcahy was the Leader of Fine Gael, but MacBride and many other Irish Republicans had never forgiven Mulcahy for his role in carrying out 77 executions under the government of the Irish Free State in the 1920s during the Irish Civil War. To gain the support of Clann na Poblachta, Mulcahy stepped aside in favour of Costello. Two Clann na Poblachta TDs joined the cabinet; MacBride became Minister for External Affairs while Noël Browne became Minister for Health.

On his ministerial accession, MacBride sent a telegram to Pope Pius XII offering:
"...to repose at the feet of Your Holiness the assurance of our filial loyalty and our devotion to Your August Person, as well as our firm resolve to be guided in all our work by the teaching of Christ and to strive for the attainment of a social order in Ireland based on Christian principles".

At MacBride's suggestion, Costello nominated the northern Protestant Denis Ireland to Seanad Éireann, the first resident of Northern Ireland to be appointed as a member of the Oireachtas. While a Senator (1948–1951), Ireland was Irish representative to the Council of Europe assisting MacBride in the leading role he was to play in securing acceptance of the European Convention on Human Rights—signed in Rome on 4 November 1950. In 1950, MacBride was president of the Council of Foreign Ministers of the Council of Europe, and he was vice-president of the Organisation for European Economic Co-operation (OEEC, later OECD) in 1948–1951. He was responsible for Ireland not joining the North Atlantic Treaty Organisation (NATO).

He was instrumental in the repeal of the External Relations Act and the passing of the Republic of Ireland Act which came into force in 1949. It declared that Ireland may officially be described as the Republic of Ireland and that the President of Ireland had the executive authority of the state in its external relations.

In 1951, MacBride controversially ordered Noël Browne to resign as a minister over the Mother and Child Scheme after it was attacked by the Irish Catholic hierarchy and the Irish medical establishment.Whatever the merits of the scheme, or of Browne, MacBride concluded in a Cabinet memorandum:
"Even if, as Catholics, we were prepared to take the responsibility of disregarding [the Hierarchy's] views, which I do not think we can do, it would be politically impossible to do so . . . We are dealing with the considered views of the leaders of the Catholic Church to which the vast majority of our people belong; these views cannot be ignored."

Also in 1951, Clann na Poblachta was reduced to two seats after the general election. MacBride kept his seat and was re-elected again in 1954. Opposing the internment of IRA suspects during the Border Campaign (1956–1962), he contested both the 1957 and 1961 general elections but failed to be elected both times. He then retired from politics and continued practising as a barrister.

International politics

In 1929 an Irish section of the League Against Imperialism was formed and MacBride served as its secretary.

MacBride served as the International Chairman of Amnesty International from 1961 until 1975. He was Secretary-General of the International Commission of Jurists from 1963 to 1971. Following this, he was also elected Chair (1968–1974) and later President (1974–1985) of the International Peace Bureau in Geneva. He was vice-president of the Organisation for European Economic Co-operation from 1948 to 1951 and President of the Committee of Ministers of the Council of Europe in 1950. He was also involved in the International Prisoners of Conscience Fund and was appointed the International Commission for the Study of Communication Problems in 1977.

He drafted the constitution of the Organisation of African Unity (OAU); and also the first constitution of Ghana (the first UK African colony to achieve independence) which lasted for nine years until the coup of 1966.

In 1966, the US government reported that he had been involved with a Central Intelligence Agency (CIA) funding operation.

MacBride was a signatory of the Convention for European Economic Co-operation, the Convention for the Protection of War Victims (1949) and the European Convention on Human Rights. He also played a part in drawing up the constitutions of Ghana, Zambia and Tanzania.

Some of MacBride's appointments to the United Nations System included:
Assistant Secretary-General
President of the General Assembly
High Commissioner for Namibia, in which capacity he created the United Nations Institute for Namibia 
President of UNESCO's International Commission for the Study of Communications Problems, which produced the controversial 1980 MacBride report.

Human rights
Throughout the 1950s, 1960s and 1970s, MacBride worked for human rights worldwide. He took an Irish case to the European Court of Human Rights after hundreds of suspected IRA members were interned without trial in the Republic of Ireland in 1958. He was among a group of lawyers who founded JUSTICE—the UK-based human rights and law reform organisation—initially to monitor the show trials after the 1956 Budapest uprising, but which later became the UK section of the International Commission of Jurists. He was active in a number of international organisations concerned with human rights, among them the Prisoners of Conscience Appeal Fund (trustee).

In 1973, he was elected by the General Assembly to the post of High Commissioner for Namibia, with the rank of Assistant Secretary-General. The actions of his father John MacBride in leading the Irish Transvaal Brigade (also known as MacBride's Brigade) on the side of the Boer republics against the British in the Second Boer War gave MacBride a unique access to South Africa's apartheid government. In 1977, he was appointed president of the International Commission for the Study of Communication Problems, set up by UNESCO. In 1980 he was appointed Chairman of UNESCO. MacBride supported the Dunnes Stores Strike and attended at least one of their gatherings in May 1985.

MacBride's work was awarded the Nobel Peace Prize (1974) as a man who "mobilised the conscience of the world in the fight against injustice". He later received the Lenin Peace Prize (1975–76) and the UNESCO Silver Medal for Service (1980). He received the Lenin Peace Prize for his opposition to what MacBride referred to as "this absolutely obscene arms race." He was one of only two to win both the Lenin and Nobel peace prizes, the other being Linus Pauling.

During the 1980s, he initiated the Appeal by Lawyers against Nuclear War which was jointly sponsored by the International Peace Bureau and the International Progress Organization. In close co-operation with Francis Boyle and Hans Köchler of the International Progress Organization he lobbied the General Assembly for a resolution demanding an Advisory Opinion from the International Court of Justice on the legality of nuclear arms. The Advisory Opinion on the Legality of the Threat or Use of Nuclear Weapons was eventually handed down by the ICJ in 1996.

In 1982, MacBride was chairman of the International Commission to enquire into reported violations of International Law by Israel during its invasion of the Lebanon. The other members were Richard Falk, Kader Asmal, Brian Bercusson, Géraud de la Pradelle, and Stefan Wild. The commission's report, which concluded that "the government of Israel has committed acts of aggression contrary to international law", was published in 1983 under the title Israel in Lebanon.

He proposed a plan in 1984, known as the MacBride Principles, which he argued would eliminate discrimination against Irish Catholics by employers in Northern Ireland and received widespread support for it in the United States and from Sinn Féin. However the MacBride Principles were criticised by the Irish and British governments and most political parties in Northern Ireland, including the nationalist Social Democratic and Labour Party (SDLP), as unworkable and counterproductive.

He was also a keen pan-Celticist.

Later life and death
In his later years, MacBride lived in his mother's home, Roebuck House, that served as a meeting place for many years for Irish nationalists, as well as in the Parisian arrondissement where he grew up with his mother, and enjoyed strolling along boyhood paths. While strolling through the Centre Pompidou Museum in 1979, and happening upon an exhibit for Amnesty International, he whispered to a colleague "Amnesty, you know, was one of my children."

In 1978, he received the Golden Plate Award of the American Academy of Achievement.

Seán MacBride died in Dublin on 15 January 1988, eleven days before his 84th birthday. He is buried in Glasnevin Cemetery in a grave with his mother, and his wife, who died in 1976.

On the occasion of MacBride's death the African National Congress (ANC), Oliver Tambo stated "Seán MacBride will always be remembered for the concrete leadership he provided to the liberation movement and people of Namibia and South Africa. Driven by his own personal and political insight arising out of the cause of national freedom in Ireland ... our debt to him can never be repaid."

Legacy
Streets in Windhoek, Namibia and Amsterdam are named after him. The Headquarters of Amnesty International Ireland is called 'Seán MacBride House' in his honour. and the International Peace Bureau likewise named the 'Seán MacBride Prize' in his name.

A bust of MacBride was unveiled in Iveagh House, headquarters of the Irish Department of Foreign Affairs in 1995.

In popular culture
A novel, The Casting of Mr O'Shaughnessy, was published in 1995 (revised edition 2002) by Éamon Delaney in which the eponymous Mr O'Shaughnessy was, in the author's own words "partly, but quite obviously, based on the career of the colourful Seán MacBride".

Career summary 
1946–1965 Leader of Clann na Poblachta
1947–1958 Member of Dáil Éireann
1948–1951 Minister for External Affairs of Ireland in Inter-Party Government
1948–1951 Vice-president of the Organization for European Economic Cooperation (OEEC)
1950 President, Committee of Ministers of Council of Europe
1954 Offered but declined, Ministerial office in Irish Government
1963–1971 Secretary-General, International Commission of Jurists
1966 Consultant to the Pontifical Commission on Justice and Peace
1961–1975 chairman Amnesty International Executive
1968–1974 Chairman of the Executive International Peace Bureau
1975–1985 President of the Executive International Peace Bureau
1968–1974 Chairman Special Committee of International NGOs on Human Rights (Geneva)
1973 Vice-chairman, Congress of World Peace Forces (Moscow, October 1973)
1973 Vice-president, World Federation of United Nations Associations
1973–1977 Elected by the General Assembly of the United Nations to the post of United Nations Commissioner for Namibia with rank of Assistant Secretary-General of the United Nations
1977–1980 Chairman, Commission on International Communication for UNESCO
1982 Chairman of the International Commission to enquire into reported violations of International Law by Israel during its invasion of the Lebanon

Further reading 
 
 Jordan, Anthony J, (1993), Seán A biography of Seán MacBride, Blackwater Press

References

External links

 

1904 births
1988 deaths
Alumni of University College Dublin
Amnesty International people
Anti-apartheid activists
Burials at Glasnevin Cemetery
Clann na Poblachta TDs
Interwar-period spies
Irish barristers
Irish diplomats
Irish expatriates in France
Irish Nobel laureates
Irish officials of the United Nations
Irish Republican Army (1919–1922) members
Irish Republican Army (1922–1969) members
Irish spies for the Soviet Union
Lenin Peace Prize recipients
Ministers for Foreign Affairs (Ireland)
Sean
Members of the 12th Dáil
Members of the 13th Dáil
Members of the 14th Dáil
Members of the 15th Dáil
Nobel Peace Prize laureates
People of the Irish Civil War (Anti-Treaty side)
Soviet spies against Western Europe
People educated at Downside School